Ripley is a city in Lauderdale County, Tennessee, United States. The population was 8,445 at the 2010 census. It is the county seat of Lauderdale County.

Geography
Ripley is located at  (35.743115, −89.533872).

Ripley is located on the southeastern edge of the New Madrid Seismic Zone, an area with a high earthquake risk.

Demographics

2020 census

As of the 2020 United States census, there were 7,800 people, 3,269 households, and 2,097 families residing in the city.

2000 census
As of the census of 2000, there were 7,844 people, 3,142 households, and 2,054 families residing in the city. The population density was 612.3 people per square mile (236.4/km2). There were 3,397 housing units at an average density of 265.2 per square mile (102.4/km2). The racial makeup of the city was 51.56% White, 46.81% African American, 0.15% Native American, 0.27% Asian, 0.38% from other races, and 0.83% from two or more races. Hispanic or Latino of any race were 1.07% of the population.

There were 3,142 households, out of which 32.1% had children under the age of 18 living with them, 38.1% were married couples living together, 23.5% had a female householder with no husband present, and 34.6% were non-families. 31.0% of all households were made up of individuals, and 12.9% had someone living alone who was 65 years of age or older. The average household size was 2.44 and the average family size was 3.06.

In the city, the population was spread out, with 27.6% under the age of 18, 11.0% from 18 to 24, 27.2% from 25 to 44, 20.2% from 45 to 64, and 14.0% who were 65 years of age or older. The median age was 34 years. For every 100 females, there were 84.7 males. For every 100 females age 18 and over, there were 78.3 males.

The median income for a household in the city was $23,662, and the median income for a family was $34,183. Males had a median income of $31,321 versus $20,661 for females. The per capita income for the city was $13,710. About 22.1% of families and 27.2% of the population were below the poverty line, including 38.1% of those under age 18 and 27.5% of those age 65 or over.

Education
All parts of the county are in the Lauderdale County School District.

Public K-12 schools:

 Ripley Middle School
 Ripley Primary School
 Ripley Elementary School
 Ripley High School

Other institutions:

 Abundant Life Christian School
 First Apostolic Academy
 Gateway Christian School

Tertiary:
 Tennessee Technology Center-Ripley
 University of Tennessee-Martin, Ripley Campus

Religion

 Whitefield Assembly of God
 Maranatha Baptist Church
 Victory Baptist Church
 Asbury United Methodist Church
 Ave Maria Catholic Church
 Calvary Hill Baptist Church
 Curve Baptist Church
 First Apostolic Church
 First Assembly of God
 First Baptist Church
 First United Methodist Church
 Grace Baptist Church
 Holly Grove Baptist Church
 Kingdom Hall of Jehovah's Witnesses 
 Mary's Chapel Baptist Church
 New Beginnings Christian Center
 Walnut Grove Baptist Church
 Whitefield Assembly of God
 Immanuel Episcopal Church
 Macedonia Baptist Church
 Ripley Church of God
 Ripley Church of Christ
 Spiller Hill Church of God In Christ
 Gospel Rock Holiness Church
 Olive Branch Baptist Church
 Spirit of Deliverance Ministries
 Lightfoot Methodist Church
 Abundant Life Assembly of God
 Central Community Church
 Elam Baptist Church

Recreation and fitness

Ripley Parks and Recreation
Ripley Park, also known as Ripley Pool and Waterslide, is located at 200 Mary Robert. Its facilities include: a pool with water slide, playground equipment, seven pavilions that require reservations, grills, four athletic field complex, four state of the art tennis courts,  1.1 mile walking trail, large grassy areas parking, restrooms, and the park office.

W.G.L. Rice Park is located south of downtown Ripley, Tennessee. The park has a baseball/softball field, soccer field, tennis court, basketball court, two playgrounds, and a partial walking trail.  Rice Park is the oldest city park in Ripley.  The land for the park was donated in the early 1900s through a gift by the Rice Family and is noted for its historic Labor Day Celebration.

Downtown revitalization
As one of the six cities selected in Tennessee for downtown revitalization, extensive work is being done around the town square and adjacent areas. Work began in the fall of 2008 and the courthouse square was completed in May 2010.

 Miles O'Keeffe, Hollywood actor
 Speech, rapper and hip-hop artist
 Peetie Wheatstraw, blues musician

References

External links

 
 Map of Ripley

Cities in Lauderdale County, Tennessee
Cities in Tennessee
County seats in Tennessee
Majority-minority cities and towns in Tennessee